The 2016 Kilkenny Senior Hurling Championship was the 122nd staging of the Kilkenny Senior Hurling Championship since its establishment by the Kilkenny County Board in 1887. The championship began on 24 September 2016 and ended on 30 October 2016.

Clara were the defending champions, however, they were defeated by Ballyhale Shamrocks in the semi-final.

On 30 October 2016, O'Loughlin Gaels won the championship after a 0-19 to 1-12 defeat of Ballyhale Shamrocks in the final. This was their fourth championship title overall and their first since 2010.

Danesfort's Richie Hogan was the championship's top scorer with 0-40.

Team changes

To Championship

Promoted from the Kilkenny Intermediate Hurling Championship
 Bennettsbridge

From Championship

Relegated to the Kilkenny Intermediate Hurling Championship
 Carrickshock

Results

First round

Four of the twelve teams received byes into the quarter finals. The remaining eight teams played in four matches with the winners progressing into the quarter finals.

Relegation play-off

Quarter-finals

The four teams who received byes in the first round played the four winners from the first round.

Semi-finals

Final

Championship statistics

Top scorers

Top scorers overall

Top scorers in a single game

References

External links

 2016 Kilkenny Senior Hurling Championship results

Kilkenny Senior Hurling Championship
Kilkenny Senior Hurling Championship